Martin Anton Maurus Marty (18 October 18471 October 1914) was a Swiss-born Austrian philosopher and Catholic priest. He specialized in philosophy of language, philosophy of psychology and ontology.

Biography
Marty was a student and follower of Franz Brentano, his teacher at the University of Würzburg in 1868–70. He was ordained in 1870, but resigned from the priesthood in 1872.

He taught at the Franz-Josephs-Universität Czernowitz (Austria-Hungary) from 1875 to 1880 and after that at the University of Prague (Austria-Hungary), where from 1895 to 1897 he was twice rector.

Legacy
The Prague School linguists were influenced by his works. Franz Kafka attended his philosophy lectures while at the University of Prague.

Bibliography
 Ueber den Ursprung der Sprache (On the Origin of Language), 1875
 Die Frage nach der geschichtlichen Entwicklung des Farbensinnes, 1879
 Untersuchungen zur Grundlegung der allgemeinen Grammatik und Sprachphilosophie, 1908
 Zur Sprachphilosophie. Die „logische“, „lokalistische“ und andere Kasustheorien, 1910
 Raum und Zeit, 1916

See also
 Vilém Mathesius

Notes

References
 
 Barry Smith, Austrian Philosophy: The Legacy of Franz Brentano, Open Court Publishing, 1994, Ch. 4: "Anton Marty: On Being and Truth".
 Johannes Marek and Barry Smith, “Einleitung zu A. Martys ‘Elemente der deskriptiven Psychologie”, Conceptus, 21 (1987), 33–48, editors’ introduction to extracts from Marty’s lectures (ibid., 49–66).

External links 
 

1847 births
1914 deaths
19th-century essayists
19th-century Swiss philosophers
20th-century essayists
20th-century Swiss non-fiction writers
20th-century Swiss philosophers
Academic staff of Charles University
Academic staff of Chernivtsi University
Epistemologists
Metaphysicians
Ontologists
Philosophers of language
Philosophers of psychology
Philosophy academics
Philosophy writers
Swiss essayists
Swiss non-fiction writers
University of Göttingen alumni
University of Würzburg alumni